HMS Loch Arkaig was a  of the British Royal Navy, named after Loch Arkaig in Scotland. The ship was ordered from Caledon Shipbuilding & Engineering Company, Dundee, Scotland, on 2 February 1943, and laid down on 1 November 1943. Launched on 7 June 1944, the ship was commissioned on 1 November 1945, and completed on 17 November. Unlike the rest of the class Loch Arkaig (along with Loch Tralaig) was fitted with Parsons single reduction geared turbines, rather than 4-cylinder vertical triple expansion reciprocating engines. The ship served in the Home Fleet until laid-up and put into Reserve in 1952, and was sold for scrapping in 1959.

Service history
After sea trials and commissioning in November 1945 Loch Arkaig sailed to the Clyde in December for modifications to stiffen her hull. In January 1946 the ship carried out Squid anti-submarine mortar and radio direction finding calibration, before joining the Flotilla at Derry to take part in "Operation Deadlight". U-3514 was the last U-boat to be sunk in "Operation Deadlight".

For the next few years Loch Arkaig carried out training duties for anti-submarine personnel and Flotilla duties at Derry.

In mid-1950 she took part in Flag Officer Submarines summer war exercises and Home Fleet visits, calling at Haugesund and Nordheimsund in Norway. In December, after a refit at Chatham Dockyard she joined the 6th Frigate Flotilla, Home Fleet. In April 1951 she took part in the search for the missing submarine , before the usual programme of exercises and visits.

Disposal
In 1952 Loch Arkaig was decommissioned, and laid-up in Reserve at Hartlepool. In 1957 she was placed on the Disposal List, and sold to the British Iron & Steel Corporation (BISCO) in 1959 for demolition by J.J. King at Gateshead, arriving in tow at the breaker's yard on 28 January 1960.

References

Publications
 
 Service Histories of Royal Navy Warships in World War II : HMS Loch Arkaig

External links
 "Playing at War in the Arctic", The Sydney Morning Herald, 15 April 1949

 

1944 ships
Ships built in Dundee
Arkaig
World War II frigates of the United Kingdom
Cold War frigates of the United Kingdom